Morsang is the name or part of the name of two communes of France:
Morsang-sur-Orge in the Essonne département
Morsang-sur-Seine in the Essonne département